Wordnik, a nonprofit organization, is an online English dictionary and language resource that provides dictionary and thesaurus content. Some of the content is based on print dictionaries such as the Century Dictionary, the American Heritage Dictionary, WordNet, and GCIDE. Wordnik has collected a corpus of billions of words which it uses to display example sentences, allowing it to provide information on a much larger set of words than a typical dictionary. Wordnik uses as many real examples as possible when defining a word.

Wiktionary, the free open dictionary project, is one major source of words and citations used by Wordnik.

History 
Wordnik.com was launched as a closed beta in February 2008 and opened to all in June 2009. Cofounders of the site are CEO Erin McKean, editorial director Grant Barrett, and chief computational lexicographer Orion Montoya, and head of engineering Anthony Tam. McKean, Barrett, and Montoya all formerly worked in the US Dictionaries Department of Oxford University Press. The startup company was originally headquartered in San Mateo, California. 

In September 2009, Wordnik purchased the social language site Wordie.org. All Wordie.org accounts and data were subsequently transferred to Wordnik.

Wordnik's material is sourced from the Internet by automatic programs. It then shows readers the information regarding a certain word without any editorial influence. Wordnik does not allow for user-contributed definitions, but seems to assert that it may allow for this in the future.

In January 2011, McKean relaunched the company as Reverb Technologies, Inc. in Palo Alto, with Wordnik co-founder Anthony Tam.

Under the name Reverb, they kept operating Wordnik.com, but also expanded its technology to other services and products, including "Reverb for Publishers" which was a plug-in for blogs to find related articles.

The company began a Kickstarter campaign in 2015 with the purpose of finding and adding a million words to Wordnik that had not yet been included in major English dictionaries.

Statistics 
, Wordnik Zeitgeist reports that,

See also 
Erin McKean

References

External links 
 

Online English dictionaries
American websites
Internet properties established in 2009
2009 establishments in the United States